Sivewright is a surname. Notable people with the surname include:

Edward Sivewright (1806–1873), English cricketer
James Sivewright (1848–1916), South African businessman and politician
Jon Sivewright (born 1965), Australian actor

See also
Sievwright